Río Clarillo National Park is a national park of Chile.  It was created in 1982 to preserve the natural environment of central Chile and its native species, including the Cordilleran Cypress.

References

National parks of Chile
Protected areas of Santiago Metropolitan Region
Principal Cordillera